Cameron Park is a historic neighborhood just west of downtown Raleigh, North Carolina, one of three suburbs platted in the early 20th century. It’s one of Raleigh’s most affluent neighborhoods.  Governor Roy Cooper has a home there as well as the state’s attorney general Josh Stein and N.C. State’s chancellor Randy Woodson. Development began along Hillsborough Street and moved north; a streetcar line along Hillsborough made the location especially appealing and convenient.  Cameron Park's developers used restrictive deed covenants that set minimum house prices, created setbacks from the street, and excluded African Americans from living in the neighborhood (except as live-in domestic employees). Advertisements for Cameron Park openly recruited socially ambitious upper-middle class residents to the neighborhood, and land and house values were significantly higher than those of other early suburbs.

The neighborhood is architecturally varied, featuring Queen Anne and Colonial Revivals, large bungalows, and more eclectic styles like Georgian Revival, Tudor Revival, and Mission Revival. Despite the stylistic variety, houses were uniformly large and upscale for the era. Cameron Park was listed on the National Register of Historic Places in 1985 as a national historic district.  It encompasses 274 contributing buildings and was originally developed between about 1910 and 1935.

See also
 National Register of Historic Places listings in Wake County, North Carolina

References

External links 
 National Register Historic Districts in Raleigh, North Carolina, RHDC
 Cameron Park Historic District, RHDC
 Guide to the Blueprint plat of Cameron Park neighborhood 1910

Historic districts on the National Register of Historic Places in North Carolina
Queen Anne architecture in North Carolina
Colonial Revival architecture in North Carolina
Neighborhoods in Raleigh, North Carolina
National Register of Historic Places in Raleigh, North Carolina